The 2008 IIHF World U18 Championships were held in Kazan, Russia. The championships began on April 13, 2008, and finished on April 23, 2008. Games were played at TatNeft Arena and Arena Kazan in Kazan. Canada defeated Russia 8–0 in the final to claim the gold medal, while the United States defeated Sweden 6–3 to capture the bronze medal.

Top Division

Preliminary round
All times are local (UTC+3).

Group A

Group B

Relegation round

Final round

Bracket

Quarterfinals

Semifinals

Fifth place game

Bronze medal game

Final

Final standings

Statistics

Scoring leaders

GP = Games played; G = Goals; A = Assists; Pts = Points; +/− = Plus-minus; PIM = Penalties In MinutesSource: IIHF

Goaltending leaders
(minimum 40% team's total ice time)

TOI = Time on ice (minutes:seconds); GA = Goals against; GAA = Goals against average; SA = Shots against; Sv% = Save percentage; SO = ShutoutsSource: IIHF

Awards
Best players selected by the Directorate:
Best Goaltender:  Jake Allen
Best Defenceman:  Erik Karlsson
Best Forward:  Kirill Petrov
MVP:  Jake Allen
Source: IIHF

Media All-Stars:
Goaltender:  Jake Allen
Defensemen:  Vyacheslav Voinov /  Victor Hedman
Forwards:  Kirill Petrov /  Mattias Tedenby /  Nikita Filatov
Source: IIHF

Division I

Group A
The following teams took part in Group A of the Division I tournament, which was played in Toruń, Poland from April 2 through April 8, 2008.

Group B
The following teams will take part in Group B of the Division I tournament, which will be played in Riga, Latvia from April 2 through April 8, 2008.

Division II

Group A
The following teams took part in Group A of the Division II tournament, which was played in Meribel and Courchevel, France from March 30 through April 5, 2008.

Group B
The following teams took part in Group B of the Division II tournament, which was played in Tallinn, Estonia at Arena Premia from March 23 through March 29, 2008.

Division III

Division III consisted of two separate tournaments. The Group A tournament was held between 2 and 8 March 2008 in Mexico City, Mexico and the Group B tournament was held between 3 and 9 March 2008 in İzmit, Turkey. Mexico and Serbia won the Group A and Group B tournaments respectively and gained promotion to Division II for the 2009 IIHF World U18 Championships.

Final standings

Group A
 — promoted to Division II for 2009

Group B
 — promoted to Division II for 2009

See also
2008 IIHF World U18 Championship Division I
2008 IIHF World U18 Championship Division II
2008 IIHF World U18 Championship Division III

References

External links
Official results and statistics from the International Ice Hockey Federation
Championship
Division I – Group A
Division I – Group B
Division II – Group A
Division II – Group B
Division III – Group A
Division III – Group B

 
IIHF World U18 Championships
IIHF World U18 Championships
Hockey
Hockey
2008
World
April 2008 sports events in Europe